Pobalscoil Ghaoth Dobhair (Gweedore Community School) is an Irish-medium secondary school in the Gaeltacht district of Gaoth Dobhair, County Donegal, Ireland. It has a pupil attendance of around 400.

Alumni

Aoife Ní Fhearraigh, singer
Brídín Brennan, singer
Gavin O Fearraigh, actor
Maria McCool, singer
Natasha Nic Gairbheith, former Miss Ireland
Odhrán Mac Niallais, Gaelic footballer
Pearse Doherty, Sinn Féin TD
Rónán Mac Aodha Bhuí, radio presenter

References

Buildings and structures in Gweedore
Secondary schools in County Donegal
Community schools in the Republic of Ireland
1975 establishments in Ireland
Educational institutions established in 1975